The fourth season of the American television situation comedy Leave It to Beaver premiered on October 1, 1960 and concluded on June 24, 1961. It consisted of 39 episodes shot in black-and-white, each running approximately 25 minutes in length.

Episodes

References 

 Applebaum, Irwyn. The World According to Beaver. TV Books, 1998. .
 IMDb: Leave It to Beaver. Season 4.
 Mathers, Jerry....And Jerry Mathers as "The Beaver". Berkley Boulevard Books, 1998. .

4